The Feast of Saints Peter and Paul or Solemnity of Saints Peter and Paul is a liturgical feast in honor, of the martyrdom in Rome of the apostles Saint Peter and Saint Paul, which is observed on 29 June. The celebration is of ancient Christian origin, the date selected being the anniversary of either their death or the translation of their relics.

Eastern Christianity
For Eastern Orthodox and some Eastern Catholic Christians this feast also marks the end of the Apostles' Fast (which began on the Monday following All Saints' Sunday, i.e., the second Monday after Pentecost). While not considered among the twelve great feasts, it is one of five additional feasts ranked as a great feast in the Eastern Orthodox tradition and is often celebrated with an all-night vigil starting the evening before. In the Julian calendar, 29 June falls on the Gregorian calendar date of 12 July from 1900–2099, inclusive.

In the Russian Orthodox tradition, Macarius of Unzha's Miracle of the Moose is said to have occurred during the Apostles' Fast and the Feast of Saints Peter and Paul that followed it.

Oriental Orthodox tradition
In the Coptic Orthodox Church and the Ethiopian Orthodox Tewahedo Church, the feast of saints Peter and Paul is also celebrated on the day 5 Epip which is also the end of the fast of the apostles in these traditions.

Spiritual Christian tradition
Although the Canadian Doukhobors, a Spiritual Christian denomination, do not venerate saints, the Feast of St. Peter and St. Paul has traditionally been a day of celebration for them. Since 1895, it has acquired a new significance as a commemoration of the "Burning of the Arms", the Doukhobors' destruction of their weapons, as a symbol of their refusal to participate in government-sponsored killing. It is celebrated now by their descendants as simply "Peter's Day" (Russian: Petro den.), sometimes referred to as the "Doukhobor Peace Day".

Western Christian tradition
In the General Roman Calendar, the celebration is a solemnity. In earlier editions, it was ranked as a Double (Tridentine Calendar), Double of the First Class (e.g., General Roman Calendar of 1954), or First-Class Feast (General Roman Calendar of 1960). Prior to the liturgical reforms of Pope Pius XII, this feast was followed by a common octave. On this feast, newly created metropolitan archbishops receive from the pope the primary symbol of their office, the pallium.

It is a holy day of obligation in the Latin Church, although individual conferences of bishops can suppress the obligation. In England, Scotland and Wales the feast is observed as a holy day of obligation while in the United States and Canada, it is not. The feast ceased being a Holy Day of Obligation in the United States in 1840.

The Church of England celebrates 29 June as a festival. The Lutheran churches celebrate it in the rank of a lesser festival.

Because of the importance of Sts Peter and Paul to the Catholic Church, many Catholic-majority countries observe their feast day as a public holiday. The feast is observed in Rome because St. Paul and St. Peter are patron saints of the Eternal City. In the Apulia region of southeastern Italy, the feast was associated with the Tarantella dance since the middle ages. It was believed that the bite of the tarantula wolf spider caused a form of manic behavior which would result in death if the afflicted did not dance and could not be cured without the intercession of saint Paul. These panics were especially common near the feast day in the 16th and 17th centuries in Galatina, where the basilica of Saint Peter and Paul is located.

In Malta the solemnity is a public holiday and in Maltese is known as L-Imnarja. It is celebrated with festivals the preceding weekend in Buskett Gardens in Rabat.

It is also a public holiday of the Canton of Ticino, Switzerland, as well as parts of the Swiss cantons of Lucerne and Graubünden. It is a public holiday in Peru and in various municipalities of the Philippines. In Ormoc, festivals, bazaars, parades, and pageants are held annually on the feast day, as Peter and Paul are the city's patron saints.

In 1577 Jan Rubens named his son Peter Paul, because he was born during the office of vespers of this day.

See also
 Golowan Festival
 Incident at Antioch, a dispute between Peter and Paul
 International Day of Prayer for the Persecuted Church
 St Peter's Eve

References

External links

 The Holy Glorious and All-Praised Leader of the Apostles, Peter & Paul Icon and Synaxarion of the Feast (Orthodox)

Peter
 
Peter
Public holidays in Switzerland
June observances
July observances
Patronal festivals in Italy
Peter and Paul